Huntley Lennox Gordon (September 5, 1883 – December 15, 1967) was an American racing driver and dairy farmer. Gordon made six American Championship Car Racing starts on the west coast in 1914 and 1915. His best finish was 5th place in the 1914 race on the road course in Corona, California. He drove a Mercer in all of his race starts.

Gordon was the grandfather of off-road racer "Baja" Bob Gordon and great-grandfather of NASCAR and CART driver Robby Gordon and off-road racer Beccy Gordon. He was also the great-grandfather in-law of IndyCar driver Ryan Hunter-Reay.

External links
Huntley Gordon at ChampCarStats.com

1883 births
1967 deaths
AAA Championship Car drivers
American racing drivers
Grand Prix drivers
Racing drivers from Minneapolis
Racing drivers from Minnesota